Charles George Godfrey (17 November 1860 – 27 March 1940) was an Australian cricketer. A right-handed batsman, he played in five first-class matches for South Australia between 1885 and 1889.

References

External links
 
 

1860 births
1940 deaths
Australian cricketers
South Australia cricketers
Cricketers from Adelaide